Spinalonga is an island located in the Gulf of Elounda in north-eastern Crete, in Lasithi, next to the town of Plaka. The island is further assigned to the area of Kalydon.
It is near the Spinalonga peninsula ("large Spinalonga") – which often causes confusion as the same name is used for both.

During Venetian rule, salt was harvested from salt pans around the island. The island has also been used as a leper colony. Spinalonga has appeared in novels, television series, and a short film.

Origin of the name 

According to Venetian documents, the name of the island originated in the Greek expression στην Ελούντα stin Elounda (meaning "to Elounda"). The Venetians could not understand the expression, so they familiarized it using their own language, and called it spina "thorn" longa "long", an expression that was also maintained by the locals. The Venetians were inspired for this expression by the name of an island near Venice called by the same name and which is known today as the island of Giudecca.

History
Because of its position, the island was fortified from its earliest years in order to protect the entranceway of the port of Ancient Olous.

Arab raids
Olous, and accordingly the wider region, were depopulated at the middle of the 7th century because of the raids of the Arab pirates in the Mediterranean. Olous remained deserted until the mid-15th century, when the Venetians began to construct salt-pans in the shallow and salty waters of the gulf. Subsequently, the region acquired commercial value and became inhabited. This, in combination with the emergent Turkish threat, particularly after the Fall of Constantinople in 1453, and the continuous pirate raids, forced the Venetians to fortify the island.

Venetian rule

In 1578 the Venetians charged the engineer Genese Bressani to plan the island's fortifications. He created blockhouses at the highest points of the northern and southern side of the island, as well as a fortification ring along the coast that closed out any hostile disembarkation. In 1579, the Provveditore generale di Candia, Luca Michiel, put the foundation stone of the fortifications, built over the ruins of an acropolis. There are two inscriptions that cite this event, one on the transom of the main gate of the castle and the other on the base of the rampart at the north side of the castle. In 1584, the Venetians, realising that the coastal fortifications were easy to conquer by the enemies attacking from the nearby hills, decided to strengthen their defense by constructing new fortifications at the top of the hill. The Venetian fire would thus have bigger range, rendering Spinalonga an impregnable sea fortress, one of the most important in the Mediterranean basin.

Spinalonga, along with Gramvousa and Souda, remained in Venetian hands even after the rest of Crete fell to the Ottomans in the Cretan War (1645–1669) and until 1715, when they fell to the Ottomans during the last Ottoman–Venetian War. These three forts defended Venetian trade routes and were also useful bases in the event of a new Venetian-Turkish war for Crete. Many Christians found refuge in these fortresses to escape persecution from the Ottoman Turks.

Ottoman rule

In 1715, the Ottoman Turks captured Spinalonga, taking over the last remaining Venetian fortress and removing the last trace of Venetian military presence from the island of Crete.

Cretan revolt
At the end of the Ottoman occupation the island, together with the fort at Ierapetra, was the refuge of many Ottoman families that feared Christian reprisals. After the revolution of 1866 other Ottoman families came to the island from all the region of Mirabello. During the Cretan revolt of 1878, only Spinalonga and the fortress at Ierapetra were not taken by the Christian Cretan insurgents. In 1881 the 1112 Ottomans formed their own community and later, in 1903, the last Turks left the island.

20th-century leper colony

The island was subsequently used as a leper colony from 1903 to 1957. The last inhabitant, a priest, did not leave the island till 1962, in order to maintain the Greek Orthodox tradition of commemorating a buried person 40 days, 6 months, 1 year, 3 years, and 5 years after their death.
There were two entrances to Spinalonga, one being the lepers entrance, a tunnel known as "Dante's Gate". This was so named because the patients did not know what was going to happen to them once they arrived. However, once on the island they received food, water, medical attention and social security payments. Previously, such amenities had been unavailable to Crete's leprosy patients, as they mostly lived in the area's caves, away from civilization.

After the leper colony was dissolved, Spinalonga sank into oblivion; interest in it was revived by the work of people like Maurice Born.

Spinalonga was one of the last active leper colonies in Europe; others that have survived Spinalonga include Tichileşti in eastern Romania, Fontilles in Spain and Talsi in Latvia. As of 2002, few lazarettos remain in Europe.

Spinalonga today 

Today, the uninhabited island is a popular tourist attraction in Crete. In addition to the abandoned leper colony and the fortress, Spinalonga is known for its small pebble beaches and shallow waters. The island can easily be accessed from Plaka, Elounda and Agios Nikolaos. Tourist boats depart from all three towns on a daily basis (every 30 minutes from Elounda). Since there is no accommodation on Spinalonga, the tours last only a few hours.

Spinalonga is under consideration to become a World Heritage Site.

In popular culture

L'Ordre, released in 1973, is a documentary by Jean-Daniel Pollet that focuses on the abandoned leper colony, and in particular of the colony's articulate and compelling leader, Raimondakis. Spinalonga featured in the 1977 British television series Who Pays the Ferryman? and Werner Herzog's experimental short film Last Words. It is the (unnamed) setting of Ali Smith's short story The Touching of Wood (in Free Love and Other Stories, 1995). It is also the setting for the 2005 novel The Island by Victoria Hislop, the story of a family's ties to the leper colony; the book was adapted for television in the television series To Nisi by Mega Channel Greece.

The short story "Spinalonga" by John Ware, about a tourist group that visits the island, was included in the 13th Pan Book of Horror.

References

Sources
 
 
 
 
 
 
 Spinalonga-Paradise or Purgatory? (1986) by Beryl Darby. The Star, 46,1,6–16, (The only one reference concerning the Spinalonga leprosy colony.)
 Lekakis, Stelios (2017). "The Spinalonga Blues; notes from the field". Archaeology & Arts (online edition, archaeology.wiki)

External links
 
 Fortezza di Spina Longa and Porto di Spina Longa maps by Marco Boschini
 Werner Herzog's documentary about man from Spinalonga
 Spinalonga

Greek War of Independence
Islands of Greece
Uninhabited islands of Crete
Mediterranean islands
Landforms of Lasithi
Venetian fortifications in Crete
Leper colonies
Former populated places in Greece
Medical and health organizations based in Greece
16th-century fortifications in Greece